Cochylis psychrasema is a species of moth of the family Tortricidae. It is found in China (Yunnan and Tibet).

References

Moths described in 1937
Cochylis